Matthew Henvey (born 4 January 2000) is a Scottish professional footballer who plays as a forward.

Professional career
Henvey made his professional debut for Dundee in a 2–0 Scottish Premiership loss to Celtic on 26 December 2017, coming on as a late substitute.

Henvey was loaned to Cowdenbeath in January 2019.

At the end of the 2018–19 season, Henvey was released by Dundee.

Career statistics

References

External links
 
 Dundee FC Profile
 Sky Profile

2000 births
Living people
Scottish footballers
Dundee F.C. players
Scottish Professional Football League players
Association football forwards
Footballers from Perth, Scotland
Cowdenbeath F.C. players
Gold Coast Knights F.C. players
Scottish expatriate sportspeople in Australia
Kelty Hearts F.C. players
Scottish expatriate footballers
Expatriate soccer players in Australia
National Premier Leagues players